Gurez Assembly constituency is one of the 87 constituencies in the Jammu and Kashmir Legislative Assembly of Jammu and Kashmir a north state of India. Gurez is also part of Baramulla Lok Sabha constituency.

Member of Legislative Assembly

 1996: Faqir Mohammad Khan, Independent
 2002: Nazir Ahmad Khan Gurezi, Jammu & Kashmir National Conference
 2008: Nazir Ahmad Khan Gurezi, Jammu & Kashmir National Conference

Election results

2014

See also

 Gurez
 Baramulla district
 List of constituencies of Jammu and Kashmir Legislative Assembly

References

Assembly constituencies of Jammu and Kashmir
Baramulla district